María Esther Herranz García (born 3 July 1969 in Logroño) is a Spanish politician who served as a Member of the European Parliament with the People's Party, part of the European People's Party, from 2002 until 2019.

During her time in parliament, Herranz García served on the European Parliament's Committee on Agriculture and Rural Development and its Committee on Women's Rights and Gender Equality. She was also a substitute for the Committee on the Environment, Public Health and Food Safety, substitute for the Delegation to the EU-Chile Joint Parliamentary Committee.

Education
 1993: Degree in geography (University of Saragossa), specialising in physical geography
 1994: Master's degree in regional planning and the environment (University of Valencia
 1998: Master's degree in waste management
 Postgraduate degree in environmental management (School of Industrial Organisation)

Career
 1997-1999: Environmental consultant
 1996-2000: Chairwoman of the Environment Committee of the La Rioja branch of the PP
 since 1999: Member of the Executive Committee of the La Rioja branch of the PP
 1999: Chairwoman of the External Activities Committee of the La Rioja branch of the PP
 since 2002: Member of the National Executive Committee of the PP
 1999-2002: Adviser within the office of the President of the La Rioja Autonomous Community
 2002-2019: Member of the European Parliament

See also
 2004 European Parliament election in Spain

External links
 
 
 

1969 births
Living people
People's Party (Spain) MEPs
MEPs for Spain 1999–2004
MEPs for Spain 2004–2009
MEPs for Spain 2009–2014
MEPs for Spain 2014–2019
20th-century women MEPs for Spain
21st-century women MEPs for Spain